Keur Massar Department is one of the 46 departments of Senegal, located at the entrance to the Cap-Vert peninsula, east of Dakar.

History 
The city was erected into a department on 28 May 2021 by President Macky Sall, thus becoming the 46th department of Senegal.

Demographics 
The department has a population of 593,000 inhabitants.

References 

Departments of Senegal
Dakar Region

2021 establishments in Senegal